Milledge Lipscomb Bonham was a chief justice on the South Carolina Supreme Court. On October 16, 1854, he was born to Milledge Luke Bonham and Ann Patience Griffin. From 1863 to 1864, Bonham was educated at Sachlaben's Academy, Edgefield Academy between 1866 and 1872, and Carolina Military Institute (Charlotte) from 1875 to 1876. He was admitted to the South Carolina bar in 1877 following his tutoring of the law under Colonel Robert Aldrich. He married Daisy Aldrich on October 24, 1878, with whom he had three children. After Daisy died, Bonham remarried to Dr. Lillian L. Carter on March 2, 1925.

Bonham commenced his career editing newspapers. He aided in the establishment of the Ninety Six Guardian and subsequently relocated to Newberry, South Carolina, where he became the Newberry News' editor. Only afterwards did he relocate to Abbeville, South Carolina, where he began practicing law.

Bonham was appointed adjutant and inspector general of South Carolina by Governor John Calhoun Sheppard in August 1886 after the death of Arthur Middleton Manigault. He was elected to the post in November 1886 and reelected in 1888, serving until 1889. In 1894, Bonham moved to Anderson, South Carolina and practiced law in association with Henry Hitt Watkins.

On February 1, 1924, Bonham was made a state trial court judge; an associate justice of the South Carolina Supreme Court on February 17, 1931; and chief justice of the South Carolina Supreme Court on January 10, 1940.

He was a hereditary member of the Aztec Club of 1847.

Chief Justice Bonham died on June 23, 1943, in Anderson, South Carolina, and is buried at the Silver Brook Cemetery there.

References

1854 births
1943 deaths
People from Edgefield, South Carolina
South Carolina lawyers
People from Newberry, South Carolina
People from Abbeville, South Carolina
American militia generals
People from Anderson, South Carolina
Justices of the South Carolina Supreme Court
Chief Justices of the South Carolina Supreme Court